Donald J. Mastronarde is an American classical scholar, currently the Professor of the Graduate School, Emeritus Melpomene Distinguished Professor of Classical Languages and Literature at University of California, Berkeley and an Elected Fellow of the American Academy of Arts & Sciences.

References

Year of birth missing (living people)
Living people
University of California, Berkeley faculty
American literary historians
Amherst College alumni
Alumni of the University of Oxford
University of Toronto alumni
Historians from California